Olam (stylized OLAM)  is a network of Jewish and Israeli organizations that work in the fields of  global service, international development and humanitarian aid. It was launched in 2015 by the Alliance for Global Good, Charles and Lynn Schusterman Family Philanthropies and the Pears Foundation.

OLAM, whose name is "an allusion to the Hebrew term tikkun olam (repairing the world), one of the central tenets of Jewish tradition", brings together more than fifty Jewish and Israeli organizations working in international development and humanitarian relief. According to its website, OLAM seeks: to inspire, educate, and empower Jewish leaders to become champions for global service, international development, and humanitarian aid; to bring together Jewish and Israeli global service, international development, and humanitarian aid practitioners to network, learn, and pursue ethical best practices; and to increase the visibility of its partners and global issues in the Jewish community.

OLAM's chief executive officer, since 2015, is Dyonna Ginsburg, who previously worked at the Jewish Agency for Israel. Its staff are based in the United States, Israel and the United Kingdom.

References

External links

LinkedIn profile
Facebook page
OLAM on Twitter
Instagram page
YouTube channel

2015 establishments in Israel
International development agencies
International organizations based in Israel
International volunteer organizations
Jewish organizations established in 2015
Non-profit organizations based in Israel